The Gods of the Underworld is a novel by Stephen Cole, featuring Bernice Summerfield, a character from the spin-off media based on the long-running British science fiction television series Doctor Who.

External links
Big Finish Productions - Bernice Summerfield: The Gods of the Underworld

2001 British novels
Bernice Summerfield novels
British science fiction novels
Novels by Stephen Cole